Morrisonville is a small town in Christian County, Illinois, United States. The population was 997 at the 2020 census.

Geography
Morrisonville is located at  (39.419276, -89.457320).

Demographics

As of the 2020 census there were 997 people, 439 households, and 315 families residing in the village. The racial makeup of the village was 94.98% White, 0.20% African American, 0.10% Native American, 0.20% from other races, and 4.51% from two or more races. Hispanic or Latino of any race were 1.71% of the population.

There were 439 households, out of which 62.64% had children under the age of 18 living with them, 58.31% were married couples living together, 10.25% had a female householder with no husband present, and 28.25% were non-families. 25.28% of all households were made up of individuals, and 11.16% had someone living alone who was 65 years of age or older. The average household size was 2.93 and the average family size was 2.56.

The village's age distribution consisted of 27.4% under the age of 18, 7.2% from 18 to 24, 23.4% from 25 to 44, 25.9% from 45 to 64, and 16.2% who were 65 years of age or older. The median age was 37.0 years. For every 100 females, there were 101.3 males. For every 100 females age 18 and over, there were 102.7 males.

The median income for a household in the village was $64,219, and the median income for a family was $77,847. Males had a median income of $50,078 versus $30,500 for females. The per capita income for the village was $31,368. About 5.4% of families and 9.0% of the population were below the poverty line, including 21.9% of those under age 18 and 6.6% of those age 65 or over.

History
Morrisonville is a small, rural town in Central Illinois. Morrisonville has a rich history dating back to a time when it was used as a hunting ground for Native American Indians.

Before settlers established a town, four Indian tribes lived on Morrisonville's land, the Sac, Fox, Pottawatomie, The Sammich, and Kickapoo. They competed with each other for buffalo, elk, and deer. Morrisonville was also part of the Black Hawk hunting ground.

Since 1492, six flags have flown over what is now Morrisonville, including Spain, France, Great Britain, Virginia, Indiana, and Illinois. Germans have also settled in this area. The Marsch's and Millburgs were directly from Germany and settled there.

In 1872, Morrisonville became a town. There were a few events that led up to this, such as on June 14, 1851, when Thomas Carlin, a former governor of Illinois, paid $1.25 an acre for land that is now Morrisonville, and in the fall of 1869, when Colonel James Morrison laid out the plat for the town. Colonel Morrison married Mary Ann Carlin in 1842. Mary Ann Carlin's parents were Thomas A. Carlin and Rebecca Huitt Carlin. (Thomas Carlin established the town of Carrollton, Illinois, and the town of Carlinville is named in his honor.)

After Carlin purchased the land, he left it to his daughter, and she left it to her husband, Morrison, and then, when the town was established, it was named after him. In fact, on Perrine Street, there is still a house that Colonel Morrison built and lived in with his wife after the town of Morrisonville was established. Col. Morrison made an agreement with the railroad company that he would help build a new town if the railroad company would make Morrisonville a regular place to stop.

Even though the town was named after Morrison, Joseph Poggenpohl built the first house in the Morrisonville area in February 1870. Then, in May of the same year, the railroad was laid diagonally through Morrisonville. Once the railroad was established, Morrisonville became a regular stopping place for all trains and passengers. As soon as this happened, the town grew in population and business. After the first resident in the town proper, Richard McLean, built his house, people came here looking for a better living.

Since 1871, many land additions have been annexed to this town, such as T.F. Potts, Perrine, Johnson, Pence, Cloyd, and Shull. All of these streets were named after people who loved the land of Morrisonville and wanted to see it grow and prosper. Since its founding in 1872, people have found many ways to socialize, learn, live, and make a living in Morrisonville.

The first Morrisonville picnic was held on August 27, 1923, and it included a parade beginning on Sarpy Street, and marching to the City Park, speakers, a $1.00 prize for the tallest and shortest man, a fat man race (first prize was a sammich), and free movies shown. Many people attended the event, as they still do today.  It also includes the world's largest bull frog jumping contest.

A craze that hit Morrisonville in the mid-1880s was roller skating. In fact, it was so popular a building was built just for roller skating. It was later used as the Knights of Columbus hall. In 1926, the Knights of Columbus purchased the “Opera House” from the Morrisonville Moose Lodge. Many activities were held there, including dances, card parties, talent shows, church bazaar, and roller-skating.

Ever since the 1920s, the local lumber company (Morrisonville Lumber Company) has remained in the same location, and fire has destroyed two office buildings; one in the early 1920s, and one in 1974.

Through the years, Morrisonville has been known as a very religious community. Some churches in Morrisonville are the First Baptist Church, the First United Presbyterian Church, St. Maurice Church, and the United Methodist Church. Colonel Morrison donated the land for St. Maurice. The first church was a large frame building on the corner of Fuller and Third Streets, and cost $4,000. “Schools in and around Morrisonville have made a big part of our history.”

In 1870, the first school was built. It also served as a Sunday school and a town hall. The present St. Maurice School was built in 1922, and contained a full basement and a large room across the entire front of the school. “Country children would drive a horse and buggy to school.”

Some of the first businesses to open in Morrisonville that are still open today are Becker's Clothing Store and Morrisonville Lumber Company.

When Morrisonville abandoned the old Village Hall/firehouse, the Morrisonville Historical Society was organized in an effort to raise funds for preservation of this historic building, and renovate it for a museum. They housed artifacts such as old clothing, dolls and doll furniture, a collection of typewriters, old school and business pictures, sports memorabilia, and Morrisonville's first jail cell.

Some famous people from Morrisonville are the founder of the Steak 'n Shake food chain, Augustus Belt; the inventor of the Eversharp pen and pencil, John Wahl; and a famous playwright and poet who won the Pulitzer Prize in 1935, Zoe Akins.

Organizations 
 Morrisonville Farmer's Co-op Company
 Morrisonville Times
 Boy Scouts
 American Legion Auxiliary
 Girl Scouts
 FFA
 4-H Club
 Kitchell Memorial Library
 Knights of Columbus
Alignment Specialty

Churches
 First Baptist Church
 First United Presbyterian Church
 St. Maurice Catholic Church
 The United Methodist Church

Cemeteries
 St. Maurice Cemetery
 Morrisonville Cemetery

Schools
 Morrisonville Elementary School
 St. Maurice Catholic School (Now Closed)
 Chrismont Safe School (Moved to Nokomis)
 Morrisonville Jr./Sr. High School

Museums
 Morrisonville Historical Museum

Notable people 

 Augustus "Gus" Belt, the founder of the Steak 'n Shake food chain; born in Morrisonville
 Harry Forrester, member of Illinois Basketball Hall of Fame and Quincy University Hall of Fame; born in nearby Raymond, Illinois
 Wayne Rosenthal, state of Illinois official (Illinois Department of Natural Resources)
 Al Unser, catcher for the Detroit Tigers and Cincinnati Reds; born in Morrisonville

The beginning of Morrisonville

A former governor of Illinois, Thomas Carlin, entered the land on which Morrisonville is located on June 14, 1851, paying $1.25 per acre. Colonel James Lowry Donaldson Morrison, for whom the town was named, married Governor Carlin's daughter, Mary, and acquired title after her death. Col. Morrison laid out the town in the fall of 1869 under the supervision of the Decatur & East St. Louis Railroad Company, donating half of the land with the express condition that the railroad would make Morrisonville "a regular stopping place for all trains". In addition he donated 50 lots to those who were willing to settle permanently in the new townsite and erect homes on them.

The main part of the town, comprising , was located on the west half of the north-west quarter of section 8, and was surveyed and platted by Richard M. Powell, county surveyor. The plat was filed in the County Recorder's office April 8, 1871. The following additions have been annexed: W.E. Morrison, T.F. Potts, Pence, Cloyd and Shull.

Lumber for the first buildings in Morrisonville was hauled from Butler in Montgomery County—the railroad being built six months after the location of the town. The first resident was James Arnold; however, his tract was not within the limits of the town. The first settler in the town proper, then, was Richard McLean, who erected the first house in January, 1870. It was located near the depot and was used for saloon purposes. Joseph Poggenpohl built the first dwelling-house in February of the same year; quickly followed by N.N. Bell, James Sanford and A. Wall. N.N. Bell erected the first store building, and goods for his store were the first shipped on the new railroad. C.M. Leiberman built and opened up the second store, and his establishment, as that of Mr. Bell, was located on Carlin Street. D.F. Bonnell became the third merchant, all of these men entering commercial life at Morrisonville during 1870. E. Green was the first carpenter; H. Means had the first mill; Stewart and Post had the first elevator; Anson Wall opened the first hotel; Chris Wucherpfennig was the first blacksmith; a Mr. Tetzloff was the first wagonmaker; Chedister & Shull were the first lumber dealers; C. Townsend and Co. were the first druggists; William Wilkins was the first banker; George Britton conducted the first hardware store; Dr. C. Voorhees was the first physician; and George Hall was the first child born in the town limits. When the census was taken in 1870, there were 128 residents.

The town was incorporated under the general city and village law in May, 1872. The first board of trustees consisted of the following: C.M. Leiberman, Dr. C. Voorhees, W.T. Ricks, E.S. Shull, and J.R. Hall. Dr. Siras Irion was police magistrate.

The Village Hall

The village hall in Morrisonville was constructed in 1891.

The original construction was destroyed by fire in April, 1891, and construction on the present building was started soon after the fire.

The bricks used in this structure were manufactured in Morrisonville at the Fleigle Tile yard.

After its completion, the second floor of the building was used as the office and meeting place for the village board of trustees; the jail and storage area for the fire equipment being on the ground floor.

Because of deterioration of the second floor, the village board has been holding their meetings for the past few years in a rented building on Carlin Street.

Beckers Clothing Store

John M. Becker, owner and operator of Becker's Clothing Store in Morrisonville, began his business career in 1901 as a clerk in H.C. Bahn's Clothing Store in Morrisonville. Mr. Becker's first job with Col. Bahn included the daily menial tasks of cleaning six brass spittoons, filling the coal-oil lamps, and mopping the floor.

In May, 1908, the Becker brothers, John and Ted, made the rather obscure beginnings of business that grew into one of the best-known establishments in the southern part of Christian County. John M. Becker purchased his brother's interest in 1918 and operated the store under the name "Becker's Clothing Store" for many years.

In the early years of his business career, big families came in the fall of the year to buy all their needs for the winter months, such as woolen underwear, a blue or black suit, and some stiff shirt collars. Some of his good customers were people from the Brown settlement, between Morrisonville and Farmersville.

The firm's motto, "Dependable Merchandise at Reasonable Prices," has always been a guiding factor, and is felt responsible for drawing loyal dependable patronage throughout over 60 years of continuous business.

After 107 years in business, Beckers Clothing Store closed its doors at the end of August, 2014.

General Stores
N.N. Bell built the first store building, and goods for his store were the first shipped on the new railroad. C.M. Leiberman built and opened up the second store, and his store, as that of Mr. Bell, was located on Carlin Street. D.F. Bonnell became the third merchant, all of these men entering commercial life at Morrisonville during 1870.

On February 8, 1915, the DRL Supply Company began business in Morrisonville. The Lentz brothers, Henry and Theodore, started in business when they purchased the interest of the late E.C. Dey in the grocery and dry goods firm that was then known as Dey & Rittger. The firm name was changed to DRL Supply Co., with the late Charles Rittger managing the dry goods department and the Lentz brothers in charge of the grocery department. In April 1936, the buildings housing the DRL were destroyed by fire and all stock was a total loss. The store was rebuilt immediately following the fire, and in November 1937, there was a move into a new modern brick building. DRL Supply Co. is now closed and has been for many years.

Other general stores opened in the past include Thatcher Millinery and Fancy Goods Store and Johnson Equipment Company.

Grocers and Bakeries
Some of the older grocery stores in Morrisonville were DRL Supply Company, Atzger Bakery & Confectionery, Miller Bros. Meat Market, W.L. Long, Weber's Grocery, and others.

In 1937, Melvin Stewart came to Morrisonville from Hillsboro, with his wife, Elizabeth, and sons, Bob and Jim. He worked for the late Charles Shake in his grocery store and meat market for four years. In 1941, Melvin's brother, Robert H. and his family also moved to Morrisonville, and the two brothers opened a small IGA store which was located in the former Zeb Safrit grocery store building. Later, with the encouragement and patronage of farmers in the community, they installed a locker plant in the rear of the building. When the locker business was discontinued in 1952, Mr. Stewart remodeled the store. The Green's Tavern and Smitty's TV buildings have since been added to the store. In the 1980s, a bakery, movie rental, and coffee shop were added to the business. Vicky Furness was the owner. In 2013 the beloved IGA closed due to the death of Vicky. In 2013, Larry Langen along with his wife Susan, and brother John Langen bought the grocery store. They tore it down and built a completely new grocery store in its place. It is called "Sixth Street Market".

In Morrisonville's early days, a grocery store would have looked like this: the front entrance was in the middle of the front wall and often consisted of double doors that could be opened to admit the passage of large articles, and often similar double doors on each side that could be opened when necessary to take counters and such bulky objects in or out of the building. The upper parts of all these doors were fitted with glass to allow the entrance of as much light as possible. Called transom windows, they would tilt inward allowing air near the ceiling to flow in the days before air conditioning.

References

Villages in Christian County, Illinois
Villages in Illinois
Populated places established in 1872
1872 establishments in Illinois